Domville is a rural locality in the Toowoomba Region, Queensland, Australia, about  south of Milmerran.

Millmerran was known as Domville for five years between 1 June 1889 and 16 November 1894.

History
Domville's name is from Thomas John Domville Taylor (1817-1889), whose sketch of Mount Domville is held by the National Library of Australia. He was also the artist of a rare sketch showing an historic event, the 1843 Battle of One Tree Hill.

Geography
The north and eastern part of the locality is farmland with the Commodore Mine in the south-west extending into neighbouring Clontarf. It is part of the Balonne-Condamine drainage basin. The Millmerran–Inglewood Road (State Route 82) forms the north-western boundary.

References

Toowoomba Region
Localities in Queensland